Deokgasan is a mountain in the city of Wonju, Gangwon-do in South Korea.

See also
List of mountains in Korea

Notes

References

Mountains of Gangwon Province, South Korea
Wonju
Mountains of South Korea

zh:德加山 (江原道)